The 19th Canadian Film Awards were held on September 23, 1967 to honour achievements in Canadian film. The ceremony was hosted by Fred Davis.

Winners

Films
Film of the Year: Warrendale — Canadian Broadcasting Corporation, Allan King producer and director
Feature Film: Warrendale — Canadian Broadcasting Corporation, Allan King producer and director
Arts and Experimental: Angel — National Film Board of Canada, Guy Glover producer, Derek May director
Television Film: Land of the Loon — Dan Gibson Productions, Dan Gibson producer and director, tied with
Wojeck: The Last Man in the World — Canadian Broadcasting Corporation, David Peddie producer, Ron Kelly director
Films for Children: Dimensions — National Film Board of Canada, Jacques Bobet producer, Bernard Longpré director
Travel and Recreation: Adventure: Trent Severn Style — Dan Gibson Productions, Dan Gibson producer and director, tied with
The Entertainers — Crawley Films, F. R. Crawley producer, Seaton Findlay director
General Information: Helicopter Canada — National Film Board of Canada, Peter Jones and Tom Daly producers, Eugene Boyko director, tied with
Notes for a Film About Donna & Gail — National Film Board of Canada, Julian Biggs producer, Don Owen director
Public Relations: Global Village — Crawley Films, F. R. Crawley producer and director tied with 
Movin' — Peterson Productions, Judy Birkett producer, Gordon Lightfoot director
Sales Promotion: The Perpetual Harvest — Crawley Films, F. R. Crawley and Peter Cock producers, Peter Cock director
Amateur: Not awarded

Non-Feature Craft Awards
Black-and-White Cinematography: Grahame Woods — Wojeck: The Last Man in the World (CBC)
Colour Cinematography: Gilles Gascon — Element 3 (Élément 3) (NFB)
Direction: Ron Kelly — Wojeck: The Last Man in the World (CBC) tied with Allan King — Warrendale (CBC)
Film Editing: Jacques Kasma —  Trois hommes au mille carré (Ghosts of a River) (NFB)

Special Award
Helicopter Canada — National Film Board of Canada, Peter Jones and Tom Daly producers, Eugene Boyko director — "for providing a superbly appropriate and inspiring opportunity for Canadians to view their country in the Centennial Year".

References

Canadian
Canadian Film Awards (1949–1978)
1967 in Canada